Kallemäe is a village in Saaremaa Parish, Saare County, Estonia, on the island of Saaremaa. As of 2011 Census, the settlement's population was 39.

Kallemäe is home to a special school for children with lite mental disabilities. There's also a local shop in the village. A post office was closed there in November 2007.

References

External links
Kallemäe School 

Villages in Saare County